The electoral district of Ipswich East was a Legislative Assembly electorate in the state of Queensland. It was first created in a redistribution ahead of the 1960 state election, and existed until the 1972 state election.

Ipswich East incorporated much of the former Electoral district of Bremer.

Ipswich East was abolished in 1972, mostly replaced by Wolston.

Members for Ipswich East
The members for Ipswich East were:

Marginson went on to represent Wolston from May 1972 to October 1977.

Election results

See also
 Electoral districts of Queensland
 Members of the Queensland Legislative Assembly by year
 :Category:Members of the Queensland Legislative Assembly by name

References

Former electoral districts of Queensland
1960 establishments in Australia
1972 disestablishments in Australia
Constituencies established in 1960
Constituencies disestablished in 1972